Cold in California is the third studio album released by the pop-rock band Ingram Hill August 21, 2007.

Track listing
"I Hear Goodnight" 3:26 (Ingram Hill / Mike Daly)
"Four Letter Word" 3:17 (Ingram Hill)
"What You Want" 3:40 (Adam Watts / Andy Dodd / Ingram Hill)
"Million Miles Away" 3:21 (Chris Fradkin / Joey Alkes / Peter Case)
"She Wants to Be Alone" 3:18 (Adam Watts / Andy Dodd / Ingram Hill)
"Why Don't You" 3:23 (Adam Watts / Andy Dodd / Ingram Hill)
"Something to Cry To" 3:23 (Ingram Hill / Mike Daly)
"Impossible" 3:19 (Ingram Hill)
"Finish What We Started" 3:26 (Danielle Brisebois / Ingram Hill / Oliver Leiber / Steve Robson)
"Troubled Mercy" 3:07 (Adam Watts / Andy Dodd / Ingram Hill)
"Cold in California" 3:43 (Ingram Hill / Joe Firstman)

Personnel
Justin Moore - Lead vocals, Rhythm guitar
Matt Chambless - Drums
Shea Sowell - Bass, backing vocals
Phil Bogard - Lead Guitar
Robert Hadley - Mastering Engineer

Ingram Hill albums
2007 albums